The 2006 Black-Eyed Susan Stakes was the 82nd running of the Black-Eyed Susan Stakes. The race took place in Baltimore, Maryland on May 19, 2006, and was televised in the United States on the Bravo TV network owned by NBC. Ridden by jockey Ramon Dominguez, Regal Engagement, lost the race by two lengths to runner-up Smart N Pretty after being interfered with. Smart N Pretty was taken down and the race was awarded to Regal Engagement.  Approximate post time on the evening before the Preakness Stakes was 5:14 p.m. Eastern Time and the race was run for a purse of $250,000. The race was run over a fast track in a final time of 1:50.11. The Maryland Jockey Club reported total attendance of 24,554. The attendance at Pimlico Race Course that day was a record crowd for Black-Eyed Susan Stakes Day.

Payout 

The 82nd Black-Eyed Susan Stakes Payout Schedule

$2 Exacta:  (6–2) paid   $24.00

$2 Trifecta:  (6–2–4) paid   $58.00

$1 Superfecta:  (6–2–4–3) paid   $138.30

The full chart 

 Winning Breeder: Helen & Stewart Armstrong; (KY)  
 Final Time: 1:50.11
 Track Condition: Fast
 Total Attendance: 24,554

See also 
 2006 Preakness Stakes
 Black-Eyed Susan Stakes Stakes "top three finishers" and # of starters

References

External links 
 Official Black-Eyed Susan Stakes website
 Official Preakness website

2006 in horse racing
2006 in American sports
2006 in sports in Maryland
Black-Eyed Susan Stakes
Horse races in Maryland